This is a list of settlements in Merseyside by population based on the results of the 2011 census. The next United Kingdom census will take place in 2021. In 2011, there were 20 built-up area subdivisions with 5,000 or more inhabitants in Merseyside, shown in the table below.

Administrative boundaries 

Table outlines many of the county's settlements, and is formatted according to their metropolitan borough.

Population ranking 

Notes:
 † - Huyton and Halewood included in Liverpool count for ONS subdivision area purposes. Liverpool borough-only figures at 2001/2011 censuses were 439,473 and 466,415.
 ‡ - Garswood with Downall Green fall under the Metropolitan Borough of St Helens in Merseyside. These make up the western portion of Ashton-in-Makerfield, which itself is in the Metropolitan Borough of Wigan in neighbouring Greater Manchester.

See also 
 Merseyside
 Liverpool built-up area

References

External links 
 ONS Census website

Merseyside-related lists
Geography of Merseyside
Metropolitan areas of England
 
Merseyside